Holy Martyrs Armenian School can refer to:
 Ferrahian Armenian School (includes Holy Martyrs Armenian Elementary School) in Los Angeles
 Holy Martyrs Armenian Day School in Bayside, New York